Sweden competed at the 1920 Summer Olympics in Antwerp, Belgium. 260 competitors, 247 men and 13 women, took part in 100 events in 18 sports.

Medalists

Aquatics

Diving

Twelve divers, eight men and four women, represented Sweden in 1920. It was the nation's third appearance in the sport. Four of the eight men took a medal each, and the group added three fourth-place finishes. Sweden's four plain high divers took the top four places in that event, with Adlerz (fourth in the plain high dive) adding a silver in the platform. On the women's side, Olliwier was the only diver to advance to the final; she finished with the bronze medal.

 Men

Ranks given are within the semifinal group.

 Women

Ranks given are within the semifinal group.

Swimming

Thirteen swimmers, nine men and four women, represented Sweden in 1920. It was the nation's fourth appearance in the sport.

The breaststroke was Sweden's strength, with all five men's individual finals appearances made by three swimmers in those two events. Malmrot and Henning finished first and second, respectively, in both events. Malmrot also posted a new Olympic record in the 200 metre event. The men's relay also advanced to the finals, placing fourth.

The women's relay team added a fifth medal just by showing up—only three teams competed. The Swedish women took bronze. Gylling also advanced to each of the women's individual event finals, placing sixth in both.

Ranks given are within the heat.

 Men

 Women

Athletics

64 athletes represented Sweden in 1920. It was the nation's fifth appearance in athletics, a sport in which Sweden had competed each time the nation appeared at the Olympics. Sweden had success in a variety of events, but its best performances came in the field events. Petersson took the country's only gold medal of the Games in the long jump. The team also finished with three silver and ten bronze medals, enough to put Sweden in fifth place on the athletics medals leader board despite gathering the fewest gold medals since 1900.

Ranks given are within the heat.

Fausto Acke who participated in gymnastics was also registered to participate in men's discus throw, but did not start.

Cycling

Four cyclists represented Sweden in 1920. It was the nation's third appearance in the sport. The Swedes competed only in the road time trial events, with Stenqvist posting the best time of all cyclists to take the gold medal. The combined team of the four Swedish cyclists was good for a silver medal.

Road cycling

Equestrian

Twenty-two equestrians represented Sweden in 1920. It was the nation's second appearance in the sport. Sweden took four of the seven gold medals, and finished with a total of nine medals.

The five dressage competitors initially took the top five places in the individual competition, though Boltenstern was disqualified and thus the Swedes eventually held only the top four places (no team dressage event was held in 1920). It was the second straight time that Sweden had swept the dressage medals. The eventers took the top two individual places, as well as the gold medal in the team event. The individual jumpers' best result was a bronze medal, while a separate group of riders took the gold in the team event. The vaulters had the most difficulty, coming in at the bottom four spots if finishing at all, though still receiving the bronze in the team event because only three nations entered.

Fencing

Eight fencers represented Sweden in 1920. It was the nation's fourth appearance in the sport. Lindblom was the only individual fencer to advance to a final, placing ninth in the épée. The épée was the only team event Sweden entered; the team went winless in its four matches in its semifinal pool.

Ranks given are within the group.

Football

Summary

Sweden competed in the Olympic football tournament for the third time. Its first match was an easy 9–0 win over Greece. The second match also featured nine goals, but Sweden scored only four of them to lose in extra time. Sweden also lost in the first round of the consolation tournament.

 First round

 Quarterfinals

 Consolation first round

Final rank 8th

Gymnastics

Twenty-four gymnasts represented Sweden in 1920. It was the nation's fourth appearance in the sport. Sweden entered a team in the Swedish system competition, defeating Denmark and Belgium to win the gold medal. No Swedish gymnasts competed in the individual event, nor did Sweden enter teams in the other two team events.

Artistic gymnastics

Ice hockey

Summary

Sweden competed in the inaugural Olympic ice hockey tournament. The team was unfortunate in the use of the Bergvall System, which caused the Swedes to have to play six games in seven days and resulted in a fourth-place finish for a team which would have taken the silver medal in a straight single-elimination tournament.

Sweden started well, beating Belgium and France by a combined score of 12–0. In the final, however, the team faced a dominant Canadian side and fell 12–1. In the silver medal semifinals, Sweden was again defeated, this time by the United States who went on to win the silver medal and give Sweden a chance at the bronze. The Swedes finally got their third win in the bronze medal semifinals, beating Switzerland. The bronze medal match pitted Sweden against the only team the Swedes had not yet played in the 1920 Olympic tournament; Czechoslovakia's only goal of the tournament was enough to defeat Sweden, 1–0.

 Roster
Coach:  Raoul Le Mat

 Gold medal quarterfinals

 Gold medal semifinals

 Gold medal match

 Silver medal semifinals

 Bronze medal semifinals

 Bronze medal match

Final rank 4th

Modern pentathlon

Four pentathletes represented Sweden in 1920. It was the nation's second appearance in the sport, having competed at both instances of the Olympic modern pentathlon. The Swedes continued their domination of the sport, sweeping the medals for the second time in two attempts and finishing with the four top spots in the competition.

A point-for-place system was used, with the lowest total score winning.

Rowing

Six rowers represented Sweden in 1920. It was the nation's second appearance in the sport. Both boats were eliminated in their first race.

Ranks given are within the heat.

Sailing

Eleven sailors represented Sweden in 1920. It was the nation's third appearance in the sport. There were three Swedish boats, competing in two classes, but no boats from any other nation competed against Sweden. In the 30 m² class, there was only one boat. The 40 m² was a competition between two Swedish crews. Unsurprisingly, Sweden took two gold medals and a silver.

Skating

Figure skating

Four figure skaters represented Sweden in 1920. It was the nation's second appearance in the sport; Sweden was one of three countries to compete in both Summer Olympics figure skating competitions. The top Swedish skaters took both of the singles gold medals, with their second skaters in those two events taking a silver medal and a fourth place. Sweden entered no pairs.

Shooting

Twenty-nine shooters represented Sweden in 1920. It was the nation's third appearance in the sport. Johansson won the nation's only gold medal of the year, in the 600 metre prone military rifle, as well as being on two of the medal-winning teams. In all, Sweden gathered ten medals, third-most of any nation in 1920. The six silver medals were the most of any country.

Tennis

Eight tennis players, five men and three women, competed for Sweden in 1920. It was the nation's third appearance in the sport. Fick was the most successful individual, reaching the semifinals before losing that match and the bronze medal match to take fourth place. All five of the doubles pairs lost their first match.

Water polo

Summary

Sweden competed in the Olympic water polo tournament for the third time in 1920, having won a bronze and a silver medal previously. A modified version of the Bergvall System was in use at the time. Sweden had little trouble with its first two matches, against Czechoslovakia and Brazil, but fell to Belgium in the semifinals. Belgium's eventual taking of the silver medal let Sweden contest the bronze medal. In the third-place tournament, they defeated first the Netherlands and then the United States to take the bronze medal.

 Round of 16

 Quarterfinals

 Semifinals

 Bronze medal semifinals

 Bronze medal match

 Final rank  Bronze

Weightlifting

Six weightlifters represented Sweden in 1920. It was the nation's debut appearance in the sport. The Swedes took a pair of bronze medals, and no Swedish wrestler finished lower than sixth place.

Wrestling

Thirteen wrestlers competed for Sweden in 1920. It was the nation's third appearance in the sport. Sweden was the second-most successful nation in 1920, behind only Finland. Sweden took three gold medals, as well as a silver and two bronzes.

Freestyle

Greco-Roman

References

External links
 
 
 International Olympic Committee results database

Nations at the 1920 Summer Olympics
1920
Olympics